Larisa Neiland and Arantxa Sánchez Vicario were the defending champions, but Neiland did not compete this year. Sánchez Vicario teamed up with Laurence Courtois and lost in semifinals to Nicole Arendt and Manon Bollegraf.

Anna Kournikova and Natasha Zvereva won the title by defeating Arendt and Bollegraf 6–7(5–7), 6–2, 6–4 in the final.

Seeds

Draw

Draw

References

External links
 Official results archive (ITF)
 Official results archive (WTA)

2000 WTA Tour